Fyne may refer to:

Loch Fyne in Scotland
Loch Fyne (Greenland)
Loch Fyne Restaurants, a UK seafood restaurant chain named after the loch
Fyne Court in Somerset, UK
Fyne Times, a lifestyle magazine
Fyne (software), a cross-platform graphical toolkit using Go

See also
Fiennes
Fine (disambiguation)
Fynes